The Sheffield & Hallamshire County Senior Football League is an English football league that was founded in 1983 by the merger of the former Sheffield Association League and Hatchard League. The league has three divisions – the Premier Division (which stands at level 11 of the English football league system), Division One and Division Two.

History
The competition was formed in 1983 as the result of a merger between two long standing competitions -

- The Hatchard League, formed in 1894 and named after a local politician who donated the trophy to the Sheffield & Hallamshire FA. It disbanded in 1923 but reformed after the Second World War.

- The Sheffield Association League, formed in 1897. In 1960 the league was renamed the Sheffield & Hallamshire County Senior League, a name that was retained by the new competition.

In 2011 the Football Association awarded the league's top division Step 7 status (level 11 overall) in the English football league system.

Format
For the first nine seasons of its existence the league ran with four divisions, but since 1992 there have been three divisions.

Teams play each other twice a season, and there is promotion and relegation between each division at the end of the season. As a Regional Feeder League, one Premier Division club per season can gain promotion to Step 6 (usually the Northern Counties East League), but the applying club must finish inside the top five at the end of the season and achieve the required ground grading standard.

There are three feeder leagues sitting below the County Senior League in the pyramid - the Doncaster Saturday League, Huddersfield & District League and Wakefield & District League, although promotion and relegation between the competitions is rare.

Reserve teams of clubs higher up the league pyramid play in the league, but only a maximum of three are allowed to play in the Premier Division.

Current member clubs (2022–23)

Premier Division

Division One

Division Two

Champions

Promoted
Since the league's formation in 1983, the following clubs (with their league position in brackets) have won promotion to the Northern Counties East League -
2009–10 - Handsworth (3rd)
2011–12 - Athersley Recreation (1st)
2012–13 - Shaw Lane Aquaforce (1st)
2013–14 - Penistone Church (4th)
2016–17 - Swallownest (1st)
2021–22 - Wakefield (1st)

League Cup
The league also runs a League Cup competition, which is open to all clubs in the league.

Finals

References

External links
Results site

 
Sport in Sheffield
Football leagues in England
Football in South Yorkshire
Football competitions in Yorkshire
English Football League